Ruliff Stephen Holway (or Ruliff S. Holway; 4 May 1857 - 2 December 1927) was a professor of geography at the University of California, Berkeley between 1904 and 1923. 
He was interested in the relations between humans and geography.

Life

Ruliff Stephen Holway was born on 8 May 1857 in Hesper Township, Winneshiek County, Iowa.
His parents were George Newell Holway and Amy Maria Ellison.
Holway studied at a normal school.
In 1877 he married Florence L. Conger in Winneshiek County, Iowa.

Holway spent several years teaching in high schools and the San Jose Normal School in California.
He married Mary Gordon in 1883 in San Francisco, California.
He became interested in geography during a summer course taught by William Morris Davis at Harvard University, and may well have been influenced by Davis's interest in environmentalism.
He went back to study at Stanford University and then to the University of California, where he earned a master's degree in 1904.
He was immediately appointed assistant professor of physiography at the University of California at Berkeley.
Holway succeeded George Davidson as professor of geography at Berkeley in 1905, and headed the department until he in turn retired in 1923.

The curriculum under Holway included physiography, meteorology, oceanography, mapping and commercial geography.
Holway taught various courses that dealt with relations between humans and geography that reflected conventional views of his day.
"General Physical Geography" covered "Land forms, climatology, oceanography, and planetary relations, and their effect upon human affairs".
"Geographical Influences in the Western United States" covered "The geographic conditions which have influenced the exploration and early settlement of the west and the present effect of physical factors on the life of the people".
"Geographic Influences in the Development of the United States" (1918) covered "the influence of topography and climate of the United States upon location
of cities and trade routes and upon man and his activities".

Holway's second wife died in 1922. They had no children.
He retired in 1923 and was succeeded by Carl O. Sauer.
He married Laura Etta Ogden in 1923 in Oakland California.
He died on 2 December 1927 in Oakland, California.

Publications
Holway's publications included:

Notes

Sources

1857 births
1927 deaths
American geographers